Über alles (German for above all) is a phrase from "Deutschlandlied", the German national anthem. It may also refer to:

 Über alles (album), 2003 album by Hanzel und Gretyl

See also 
 "California über alles", a song by the Dead Kennedys
 Über alles in der Welt, German title of the 1941 Nazi propaganda film Above All Else in the World